One third of Rochford District Council in Essex, England is elected each year, followed by one year where there is an election to Essex County Council.

Political control
The first election to the council was held in 1973, initially operating as a shadow authority until coming into its powers on 1 April 1974. Political control of the council since 1974 has been as follows:

Leadership
The leaders of the council since 2004 have been:

Council elections
1973 Rochford District Council election
1976 Rochford District Council election (New ward boundaries)
1979 Rochford District Council election
1980 Rochford District Council election
1982 Rochford District Council election
1983 Rochford District Council election
1984 Rochford District Council election
1986 Rochford District Council election
1987 Rochford District Council election
1988 Rochford District Council election
1990 Rochford District Council election
1991 Rochford District Council election
1992 Rochford District Council election
1994 Rochford District Council election
1995 Rochford District Council election
1996 Rochford District Council election

Composition of Council

By-election results

References

 Rochford election results
 By-election results

External links
Rochford District Council

 
Council elections in Essex
District council elections in England
Rochford District